Nore Folly (also known as Slindon Folly) is a stone construction located near the village of Slindon, West Sussex, United Kingdom. The folly resembles a gateway but is a decorative piece which leads to nowhere. It was built of flint in the 18th century by the Newburgh family, possibly due to the countess's liking an Italian picture of a building.

The National Trust, which restored the folly in 1993, states that Nore Folly was "built in 1814 for the Countess of Newburgh’s picnic parties". At that time there was a small covered building attached, which has since been torn down. It has been designated as a Grade II listed building.

A well-used, although somewhat steep, walking path leads up to Nore Folly, at which there is an outlook with a clear view over the countryside, including a view of Halnaker Windmill, a long section of the coastline, Portsmouth Spinnaker Tower, Chichester Cathedral, and Bognor Regis.

The folly has been featured on a first day cover designed by British First Day Covers Limited in 2006.

References 

Arun District
Buildings and structures completed in 1814
Buildings and structures in West Sussex
Tourist attractions in West Sussex
1814 establishments in England
Folly buildings in England